The British Rail Class 126 diesel multiple unit was built by BR Swindon Works in 1959/60 to work services from Glasgow to Ayrshire and comprised 22 3-car sets and were a development of the earlier Swindon-built trainsets that had been introduced in 1955 to work the Edinburgh Waverley - Glasgow Queen St services. These vehicles formed the first Inter City service to be operated by diesel units in Great Britain.

The introduction of these early diesel multiple units originated in a British Transport Commission report of 1952 that suggested the trial use of diesel railcars. BR's Swindon Works were chosen to design and build express units for the ex-North British Railway Edinburgh Waverley to Glasgow Queen Street route.

Description 
The cars were of integral steel construction using the bodywork as a stressed member, as opposed to the contemporary Mk1 coach design which relied on the strength of a trussed underframe. The design featured Pullman gangways and buckeye couplings.

Each of the two power cars was fitted with two AEC 150 hp underfloor engines with mechanical transmission giving a maximum speed of 70 mph. Initially termed "Inter-urban", this was soon changed to "Inter-City" long before that branding was used for mainline express services. The type was intended for longer distance services and a number of buffet vehicles were included in the orders. One of the buffet vehicles survives in preservation.

These trains had two completely different front-end designs: either a full-width cab or a half-cab with central gangway connection. The latter "intermediate" driving car allowed through access within a six-car set. Neither end featured any destination blinds or marker lights, only a box holding a stencil indicating the train classification (A, B or C; later changed to 1, 2 or 3). Power car seating was of the "open" saloon arrangement with compartment seating in the trailers. A unique multiple working control system (coded White Circle) was employed. Unlike other classes, each power car produced its own control air supply and was thus incompatible with any other.

The second batch was closely based on the 1956 stock. One big improvement was that the guard's van was moved to the rear of the coach giving passengers a forward view. Four-character headcode displays were fitted; the intermediate power cars having a two-character box either side of the gangway. Destination blinds and marker lights were not incorporated.

Operations 
The first series (79xxx numbered) were introduced to Glasgow Queen St to Edinburgh Waverley services, including those operating via Falkirk Grahamston, in January 1957; the units were allocated to Leith Central depot following its conversion from the closed railway station in 1956. However, the first six three-car sets worked their first three years on Western Region on Birmingham–South Wales services. There was criticism of the lack of a forward view for passengers and also of the plain "utility" appearance of the non-gangwayed cab front. The usual E. & G. formation was a six-car set with two trailers together in the centre of the train. The class usually stuck to this route but could appear on other services from time to time.

The second series (5xxxx numbered) were introduced on Ayrshire Coast services in August 1959 working services to Ayr and points south including Girvan and Stranraer and coastal services to Largs and Ardrossan. These units were allocated to Ayr and were operated as 3-car half sets combining to form a full 6-car trainset; the outer ends had full width windows whilst the inner ends had gangways with side windows and a side cab driving position.

The 1970s saw the first class accommodation downgraded. Being of a non-standard design, the class was not included in the DMU refurbishment programme and so remained in close-to-original condition. The main alteration was the plating over of the outer gangway connection on the DMS vehicles in 1979–81, following drivers' complaints of draughts.

The original units (79xxx series) on the Edinburgh - Glasgow services were displaced by push-pull services powered by top 'n tail Class 27s in 1971 and all were withdrawn by 1972, except for four cars transferred to Ayr. The Ayrshire Coast stock fared rather better, surviving almost intact until mass withdrawals in the early 1980s, the last two units being withdrawn in January 1983. Although used on various other routes out of Glasgow in their final years, these 126s remained closely identified with the Ayr line until displacement by a mixture of loco-hauled trains and other DMUs.  Electrification meant that DMU operations on the Ayrshire routes finally ended in 1986 with the introduction of Class 318 EMUs.

Post-BR use
Five of the ex-E&G leading power cars were overhauled and exported to Liberia for use by LAMCO mining company for staff trains.

Preservation
Four vehicles (51017, 51043, 59404 from the Ayrshire build & 79443 from the Edinburgh to Glasgow sets) survive in preservation, owned by the Scottish Railway Preservation Society and based at the Bo'ness & Kinneil Railway. The three Ayrshire vehicles have been completely overhauled inside and out with the assistance of the Heritage Lottery Fund and are currently in early DMU Green livery. They were most recently featured at the 2019 Winter Diesel Gala.

A buffet car from the earlier batch (79443) is currently undergoing complete restoration.

Three other vehicles (59098, 59099 & 79441) went to heritage lines but have now been cut up for spares.

Numbering

1956 batch

1959 batch

References

External links 

 Swindon Diesel Preservation Society

126
Train-related introductions in 1959